Armenia first participated at the Olympic Games as an independent nation in 1994, and has sent athletes to compete in every Summer Olympic Games and Winter Olympic Games since then.

Previously, Armenian athletes competed as part of the Soviet Union from 1952 to 1988, and after the dissolution of the Soviet Union, Armenia was part of the Unified Team in 1992.

Armenian athletes have won a total of 18 medals, in wrestling, weightlifting, artistic gymnastics and boxing.

The National Olympic Committee of Armenia was created in 1990 and was recognized by the International Olympic Committee in 1993.

Medals

Medals by Summer Games

Medals by Winter Games

Medals by sport

List of medalists

Flagbearers

See also 
 Armenian Olympic Committee
 Armenia at the Paralympics
 List of Armenian Olympic medalists
 Olympic competitors for Armenia
 Pan-Armenian Games
 Sport in Armenia

External links
 
 
 
 

 
Olympics